Sonicblue may refer to:

SONICblue Incorporated, a defunct American audio/video equipment manufacturer
Sonicblue Airways, a defunct Canadian airline